Henry Zeiher  (August 11, 1862 - October 14, 1951), was a professional baseball player who played catcher in the Major Leagues for the 1886 Washington Nationals. Nicknamed "Whitey," he saw only 21 at-bats, striking out at 12 of those, and reaching base in just one via a walk. Defensively, during the 37 opportunities he was given to catch for the Nationals, he committed three errors and allowed 15 passed balls.

He died in Philadelphia on October 14, 1951, and was interred at that city's Greenmount Cemetery.

References

External links

1862 births
1951 deaths
Major League Baseball catchers
Washington Nationals (1886–1889) players
Baseball players from Pennsylvania
York White Roses players
York (minor league baseball) players
Mansfield (minor league baseball) players
Sunbury (minor league baseball) players
Memphis (minor league baseball) players